Medlar-with-Wesham is a civil parish and an electoral ward on the Fylde in Lancashire, England, which contains the town of Wesham. It lies within the Borough of Fylde, and had a population of 3,245 in 1,294 households recorded in the 2001 census. rising to 3,584 at the 2011 Census.

History

In John Cary's 1794 map of England, Wales, and Scotland, the settlements are shown as Medlar and Westham. A Topographical Dictionary of England, published by S. Lewis in 1848 says:

The area within the boundaries of the parish have been populated since early medieval times, prior to the Norman conquest, with separate settlements at Bradkirk, Medlar, Wesham and Mowbreck. There was also a single moated farmstead at Pasture Barn midway between Medlar and Mowbreck. The present bridleway of Mowbreck Lane was the medieval route to Treales.

The modern town of Wesham is only about 160 years old, and developed as the railway expanded to serve the growing popularity of resort towns such as Blackpool. Locals pronounce the name Wes-ham

The population in 1851 was 170 but by 1861 was 563. The increase of population arose largely from additional employment in cotton mills. At that time the manor of Wesham, with Mowbreck Hall, belonged to J. T. Fazakerley-Westby. The hall was a fine edifice of red brick, castellated with stone and contained a domestic Roman Catholic chapel. It was once reputed to be haunted and had at one time been used as a Catholic school, one of whose pupils was Bible scholar George Leo Haydock.

A large school, used also as a lecture hall, belonging to the Independents, was built at Wesham in 1864 and opened in 1866. The premises is now the showroom for Salisburys Electricals.

A large new workhouse, to replace the much older one in Kirkham, was erected between 1903 and 1907, designed on a pavilion plan by Charles S. Haywood and Fred Harrison. Modern for its time, separate pavilions were provided for mothers and infants, and for infirm females, and also a two-roomed cottage for married couples. The heating and hot water were worked from a central station, under the control of the resident engineer, and with rotary pumps to assist circulation. The buildings were faced with Accrington red-pressed bricks, and stone dressings, the work being carried out by Sam Wilson of Lytham St. Annes. During the First World War the buildings were used as a military hospital and later became Wesham Park Hospital, a specialist geriatric and psychiatric institution). The buildings which remain today are now the administrative home to North Lancashire NHS Trust, with the remainder becoming a much needed brownfield site for the "Willowfields" housing development.

The boundaries of Wesham were established over 100 years ago and did not change until local government changes in 1935 meant that  and 48 residents were transferred to Kirkham. Kirkham lost only  of land, but with no loss of residents.

Churches

The town has two churches. Christ Church, Church of England, which is a Grade II listed building, was founded in 1894. The minister is Revd Anne Beverley and the vicarage is situated on Mowbeck Lane. The church has a graveyard and an affiliated junior school adjacent.

St Joseph's Roman Catholic was founded in 1885. The church also has a graveyard and an affiliated junior school adjacent, as well as an attached presbytery on Mowbreck Lane. The foundation stone for the church was laid, on 13 July 1884, by O'Reilly after two members of the local Billington family left funds for the construction of a Catholic church in Wesham. The church was consecrated and dedicated to St Joseph on 18 March 1886 in a large ceremony, led by Robert Cornthwaite, Bishop of Leeds. It was opened for the public on the following Sunday, 21 March 1886. In 2011 the parish was linked with that of St John the Evangelist's Church, Kirkham, and in 2013 the two joined to become a single parish, the Parish of the Holy Cross.

The Primitive Methodist chapel, located nearest to the small town square, was founded in 1895. In the 1970s the congregation joined with Kirkham. It has now been converted to private dwellings, but retains its main architectural features including foundation stones.

Industry 
Wesham Bakery, now the home of Fox's Biscuits and the largest current commercial concern, was opened in 1957, on the site previously occupied by Phoenix Mill. The factory is the home of Fox's "Rocky" biscuit. Nearby, on Garstang Road South is Salisbury's electrical showroom and a Chinese restaurant. Other small businesses, on Station Road, include a garage/tyre fitters, car sales centre, beautician, sandwich bar, hairdressers, veterinary surgeon, a pharmacy and a florist. There has been some recent light industrial and small business development in the north of the parish near junction 3 of the M55 motorway, where a Premier Inn motel and restaurant are also situated. A private residence on Fleetwood Road is the base for a Bell UH-1 Iroquois helicopter, the only flying HUEY in the UK.

Amenities

At the centre of the town is the small war memorial, with its stone statue of a First World War soldier, which enjoys attractive floral displays throughout the year and a service of remembrance on Remembrance Sunday. Around it are located the old fire station, the busy post office, the Co-op supermarket and a hair salon. In 2011 the post office campaigned successfully to remain open. In 2021 the fish and chip shop was taken over and refurbished by Seniors, a family-run chain of fish and chip shops on the Fylde Coast.

On Church Road is a popular community centre and nearby are the outdoor bowling club and the newly re-built Scout hut. The centre is used by, amongst others, Wesham Road Runners, Medlar and Wesham Town Council, Wesham Community Pride Trust and Blackpool and the Fylde College. It is also used as the town's electoral polling station. On Fleetwood Road there is a modern fire station and adjoining ambulance station.

The town also has a recreation field, equipped with a newly built skateboard park, on Fleetwood Road, where football is regularly played by local teams. The playground has recently been re-equipped with modern new play equipment and the perimeter of the field equipped with sturdy all-weather fitness stations. A doorstep green has recently been created on Derby Road near the former Fylde Borough Council offices. There are public allotments between St. Joseph's churchyard and the recreation ground and a public dog-walking area off Mowbreck Lane.

The town has three public houses – the Lane Ends, the Stanley Arms and the Royal Oak Hotel. There are three Biological Heritage Sites at Medlar Ditch, Medlar Meadows and Wesham Marsh.

The town's annual Club Day is held in early June, jointly with Kirkham. The day involves the various churches and their chosen "Rose Queens", together with biblical tableau floats, civic dignitaries and brass bands, walking in procession through the town in the morning. In 2011 Club Day was held on Saturday 11 June.

 
In January 2011, as part of a £6 million savings review by Blackpool Teaching Hospitals Trust, the purpose-built 40-bed rehabilitation unit for the elderly on Mowbreck Lane, which had been built in 2001, was closed. In 2020 work began by Lancashire and South Cumbria NHS Foundation Trust to convert the property to a new 28-bed mental health rehabilitation service called "Moving on", a term used to describe care that helps people to live independently. The centre opened on 14 March 2022.

Regular bus services are provided by the Ribble branch of Stagecoach Buses. In March 2011 the railway station, which the town shares with Kirkham, was given a makeover with a major modernisation and refurbishment of the staircase.

In January 2021 Bradley's Bar, located inside AFC Fylde's Mill Farm Stadium, was converted to become one of the North West's COVID-19 vaccination centres. The facility was adapted to meet the necessary standards to allow a safe and efficient delivery of the vaccine whilst critically maintaining social distancing requirements. A branch of Cinnabon opened in Eurogarages at Mill Farm in August 2021.

Bradkirk Business Park, on the Weeton Road, opened in 2020 and comprises 9 fully refurbished and modernised former agricultural buildings, which are used by variety of trades, including saddlery and light engineering.

Governance
The town is actively represented on Fylde Borough Council by councillors Alan Clayton and Linda Nulty, both Independent. The Lancashire County Council councillor is Stewart Jones.

The mayor is Cllr Linda Nulty and her deputy is Cllr Louise Walker. The town clerk is Angela Hunter and the other councillors are Stuart Harrison, Geoff Dixon, Peter Ball, Margaret Rawcliffe, Doug Nowell, Pete Desmond	and Liz Bickerstaff.

After a comprehensive questionnaire survey of all Wesham residents, a parish plan was published in November 2008.

Urban development

In recent years the town has seen three large housing developments: the first on greenfield land adjacent to the former Wesham Park Hospital (at which permission for 74 dwellings was granted only on appeal – "Alexandra Road"), the second with 208 houses on brownfield land at "Willow Fields" on part of the hospital site itself and a third with 109 houses at "Crossing Gates" on greenfield land between Fleetwood Road and Weeton Road. The building work at the Willow Fields site has yet to be completed.

An application was made in 2008 for outline planning permission for a development of up to 264 houses on another greenfield site, adjacent to the Biological Heritage Site at Wesham Marsh, north of Mowbreck Lane. The application was made by land-owner Metacre, a company owned by Blackpool Tower owner Trevor Hemmings, and caused much controversy amongst many existing residents, being viewed as a real threat to the rural character of the town. A pressure group was formed, several well-attended public meetings were held and a petition signed by over 90% of households was delivered. A Landscape Character Assessment was carried out by the Lancashire branch of CPRE and an ecological survey revealed the presence of the Natterjack Toad and the Great Crested Newt.

At the public meeting of the Fylde Borough Council Development Control Committee on 17 March 2010, the plan was unanimously rejected. In May 2010 the developer appealed against the decision, bringing the proposal before the Government Planning Inspector. The matter was the subject of a public inquiry which ran between 14 and 22 September 2010 at the United Reformed Church at Lytham St Annes. The appellant was represented by high-profile barrister Roger Lancaster. On 23 March 2011, it was announced that the appeal should be dismissed and planning permission refused.

On 11 November 2011 a further application was received, from the same developer, proposing a development of 100 dwellings, on part of the same site, directly overlooking the recreation ground and allotments. Soon after, a new campaign to stop the plan was initiated by the Wesham Action Group. A public meeting took place on 11 January 2012, at the Community Centre, and unanimous opposition to the plan was strongly voiced. At their meeting on 12 September, the FBC Development Management Committee refused the application.

On 9 November it was announced that an appeal against the refusal had been lodged and that the matter would be dealt with by another inquiry. The public inquiry, which was originally scheduled for four days, began on 19 February 2013, at Wesham Community Centre on Church Road, with Inspector Clive Sproule in the chair. Fylde Borough Council had announced, at short notice, that they would not attend and would not be submitting any evidence in opposition to the plan. The appellant was again represented by Roger Lancaster. In August 2013 it was announced that the Inspector had decided in favour of the appellant. Despite permission being granted at appeal, for the building of up to 100 new homes, on 2 December 2013 yet another outline application was submitted by the same developer for redevelopment of the site for up to 264 new dwellings. This application was refused.

In November 2013 local businessman David Haythornthwaite announced plans for a £12 million development of land at Mill Farm adjacent to the A585. The plan included a 6,000 capacity stadium for AFC Fylde, a Sports Science building, a full-sized football pitch, a full-sized hockey pitch, an industrial distribution centre, a hotel, an Aldi foodstore, a pub, a drive-through restaurant and a petrol filling station. A campaign group "Save Wesham and Kirkham" was formed to oppose the plan and a public meeting was arranged for 13 December, at Wesham Community Centre, to discuss the plan. Work began at the site in early 2015.

Football clubs
The town's football team AFC Fylde, formerly Kirkham and Wesham F.C., play in the National League North, having been relegated from the National League in 2020. On 11 May 2008 the team travelled to Wembley Stadium to challenge Lowestoft Town in the final for the FA Vase. They returned victorious. On 12 May there was a victory procession through the town, with the team on an open-top bus, from Kirkham Market Square to Wesham Fire Station and back again, followed by a celebratory party in the Kirkham Community Centre car park. Thousands of spectators lined the route to cheer home the victorious team.

AFC Fylde moved to their new ground, Mill Farm, at the start of the 2016–17 National League North season, bringing the team back to Wesham after playing at Kellamergh Park, Warton, until the end of the 2015–16 season.

The town is also the home to Wesham FC, who compete in the Mid Lancashire Football League Division Two and Sunday league side Wesham Town FC.

Listed buildings

The town has three buildings or structures which have Grade II Listed status:
 Bradkirk Hall Farmhouse, Weeton Road (bearing the date plaque EH:1754)
 Christ Church, Church Road
 War memorial with surrounding railings, Garstang Road South

Media
The town is served by its own free weekly newspaper, The Kirkham and Wesham Advertiser. The local newspapers are the two dailies, the Blackpool Gazette and Lancashire Evening Post, and the weekly Kirkham and Fylde Express.

References

Wilson, John Marius, (1870–72), Imperial Gazetteer of England and Wales

External links

 The Wesham Forum Billboard
  Wesham Town Website
 Wesham BBC community page
 Geograph photos of Wesham

Civil parishes in Lancashire
Geography of the Borough of Fylde